Adrian Simion (born 2 August 1961) is a former Romanian handball goalkeeper who won a bronze medal at the 1984 Summer Olympics. At the club level he played for Steaua București, winning with them eight national titles and reaching the EHF Champions League final in 1989. After retiring from competitions he worked as a mechanical engineer for the Ministry of Defence and as a handball coach for the national cadet team.

External links

External links 
 
 
 

1961 births
Living people
Sportspeople from Bucharest
CSA Steaua București (handball) players
Handball players at the 1984 Summer Olympics
Olympic handball players of Romania
Romanian male handball players
Olympic bronze medalists for Romania
Olympic medalists in handball
Medalists at the 1984 Summer Olympics